The Cabinet of the United States, which is the principal advisory body to the president of the United States, has had 17 permanent Hispanic and Latino American members serving as heads of one of the federal executive departments and 5 Hispanic and Latino American as cabinet-level officials, which can differ under each president. Of that number, no Hispanic and Latino American was elected vice president, one was appointed to the helm of multiple different departments, and one served both as Cabinet and Cabinet-rank officeholders. The U.S. Census Bureau defines Hispanic or Latino Americans as citizens or residents of the United States who have origins in Cuban, Mexican, Puerto Rican, South or Central American, or other Spanish culture or origin regardless of race. No Hispanic or Latino American ever held a Cabinet position before the Civil Rights Movement or the signing of the Civil Rights Act of 1964, which banned discrimination in public accommodations, employment, and labor unions.

Lauro Cavazos became the first Hispanic to serve in a president's cabinet when he was appointed secretary of education by President Ronald Reagan in 1988. Federico Peña was appointed secretary of transportation by President Bill Clinton in 1993 and served as secretary of energy during part of Clinton's second term, thus making him the first Latino American to hold two different cabinet positions. Aida Álvarez became the first Latina woman to serve in the president's cabinet when President Bill Clinton picked her for the cabinet-rank position of administrator of the Small Business Administration in 1997. However, the first Latina to lead a permanent cabinet office was Hilda Solis when President Barack Obama appointed her secretary of labor in 2009. Mel Martínez, who was born in Cuba, became the first foreign-born Hispanic and Latino American to serve in the presidential cabinet when President George W. Bush named him secretary of housing and urban development in 2001.

President Joe Biden named the most Hispanic and Latino Americans as secretaries to his initial Cabinet: former California attorney general Xavier Becerra as secretary of health and human services; Connecticut education commissioner Miguel Cardona as secretary of education; and DHS deputy secretary Alejandro Mayorkas as secretary of homeland security, exceeding by one the record set by President Bill Clinton and equaled by Barack Obama. However, including cabinet reshuffles during his second term in office, Obama still holds the record for most Hispanic and Latino Americans appointed to permanent cabinet positions with five, the most of any presidency, therefore surpassing Clinton's previous number of four.

The Departments of Education, Housing and Urban Development, and Labor have had the most Hispanic or Latino American secretaries with three. The Departments of Energy and Interior have had two; the departments of Commerce, Health and Human Services, Homeland Security, Justice, and Transportation have had one. No Hispanic or Latino American has led departments of Agriculture, Defense, State, Treasury, or Veterans Affairs. 

The totals for this list include only Hispanic and Latino American presidential appointees confirmed (if necessary) by the United States Senate to cabinet or cabinet-level positions and taking their oath of office; they do not include acting officials or nominees awaiting confirmation.

Permanent Cabinet members
The following list includes Hispanic and Latino Americans who have held permanent positions in the Cabinet, all of whom are in the line of succession to the presidency. The table below is organized based on the beginning of their terms in office. Officeholders whose terms begin the same day are ranked according to presidential order of succession.

 denotes the first Hispanic and Latino American holder of that particular office

Cabinet-level positions
The president may designate or remove additional officials as cabinet members. These positions have not always been in the Cabinet, so some Hispanic and Latino American officeholders may not be listed.

The following list includes Hispanic and Latino Americans who have held cabinet-rank positions, which can vary under each president. They are not in the line of succession and are not necessarily officers of the United States. The table below is organized based on the beginning of their terms in office while it raised to cabinet-level status. Officeholders whose terms begin the same day are ranked alphabetically by last name.

  denotes the first Hispanic and Latino American holder of that particular office

See also
 Hispanic and Latino Americans in the United States Congress
 List of Hispanic and Latino Americans in the United States Congress
 List of African-American United States Cabinet members
 List of female United States Cabinet members
 List of foreign-born United States Cabinet members 
 List of minority governors and lieutenant governors in the United States

Notes

References

+
+
+